The Lancer 30 Mark III or Lancer 30-3, is an American sailboat that was designed by the Canadian firm C&C Design as a cruiser and first built in 1979.

A development of the Lancer 30 Mark II, which came from the same molds as the C&C 30, the Lancer 30 Mark III design was developed into the Lancer 30 Mark IV.

Production
The design was built by Lancer Yachts in the United States starting in 1979, but it is now out of production.

Design
The Lancer 30 Mark III is a recreational keelboat, built predominantly of fiberglass, with wood trim. It has a masthead sloop rig and a fixed fin keel. It displaces  and carries  of ballast.

See also
List of sailing boat types

References

Keelboats
1970s sailboat type designs
Sailing yachts
Sailboat type designs by C&C Design
Sailboat types built by Lancer Yachts